Michael Palmer (born January 18, 1988) is a former American football tight end. He played college football at Clemson.

He started for 3 years at Clemson in which he caught 73 passes for 825 yards and 8 TDs. His senior year he caught 43 passes for 507 yards and 4 Tds while breaking multiple records for Clemson tight ends.

Professional career

Atlanta Falcons
After going undrafted in the 2010 NFL Draft, Palmer signed a rookie free agent contract with the Atlanta Falcons on April 24, 2010.  In three years with Atlanta, Palmer played in 43 games, starting five.  He caught 21 passes for 123 yards, with 3 touchdowns.

New York Giants
Palmer signed with the New York Giants on May 11, 2013. He was released on May 29, 2013.

Seattle Seahawks
Palmer was signed by the Seattle Seahawks on July 23, 2013. On August 6, 2013, he was released by the Seahawks.

Pittsburgh Steelers
On August 8, 2013, Palmer was awarded to the Pittsburgh Steelers on waivers, after injuries to three of Pittsburgh's top four tight ends.

Palmer played 2 seasons in Pittsburgh backing up Heath Miller. Palmer caught 2 passes and a TD with the Steelers before deciding to retire from football.

References

External links
Pittsburgh Steelers bio

1988 births
Living people
People from Stone Mountain, Georgia
Players of American football from Georgia (U.S. state)
American football tight ends
Clemson Tigers football players
Atlanta Falcons players
New York Giants players
Seattle Seahawks players
Sportspeople from DeKalb County, Georgia
Pittsburgh Steelers players
People from Tucker, Georgia